Student Television Network (STN) is a United States based association of high school and middle school broadcasting, film and media programs. They work with teachers to provide support and tools for the classroom. STN also hosts several contests for students and a convention that brings together over 3,000 students and teachers for four days of professional sessions, contests, and interaction with peers.

Student Television Network embraces the educational components of broadcast journalism, video production, filmmaking and media by networking students and teachers with professionals in the industry. Middle school and high school students are given varied opportunities for training, interaction, competition and critiques from qualified experts.

Objectives 
Student Television Network's objectives are:
 To help the students understand the media business better
 To give them an idea on how to enter the media world
 To give the students an idea of what to do between now and when they enter the media world
 To give the students real world, hands on experience at the convention
 To give teachers a chance to connect with other teachers and allow them to share ideas

Contests 
Student Television Network hosts several contests each year for both high school and middle school students. All contests follow strict guidelines for content, copyright and ethics. Submissions are judged by professionals in the industry and comments are given to students for evaluation. STN adheres to professional guidelines for student produced work thus ensuring that students are equipped with real world knowledge during their education.

Some of the contests they host during the year are: STN Challenges, STN Broadcast Excellence Awards, STN Film Excellence Awards, STN Nationals, Craft Achievement, Student of the Year Contest, Teacher of the Year Contest, and Teacher Video Contest.

Student Television Network also hosts the STN Honor Society. STN offers scholarships to students for convention.

Conventions 
The annual STN convention hosts more than 3,000 students and teachers from across the world. The goal of the convention is to network students and teachers with professionals who can share real life experience. The peer interaction is also significant as teachers interact with colleagues who share their struggles and successes and students explore their passion for production with others from diverse parts of the US and internationally.

STN has held conventions since 2010. The 2020 Convention was cancelled as a result of the COVID-19 Pandemic. As well, the 2021 Convention was held virtually. The 2022 Convention returned to In-Person attendance.

The four-day convention included a day devoted to an 8-hour timed contests (Crazy 8s), the Opening Ceremony, two days of breakout sessions presented by professionals in the industry, training sessions, individual program contests, Broadcast Excellence and Film Excellence Awards Night, and a formal Closing Ceremony. Every year, professionals in the industry are flown into the convention location to present sessions and judge contests.

Convention Locations and Themes

Website 
Student Television Network's website includes information for both students and teachers. It provides resources for finding colleges, lesson plans, and a glossary of broadcasting and filmmaking terms. It also includes the STN store.

STN memberships run from July 1 to June 30 each year and must be renewed annually. The membership allows you to access all of STN's resources and contests.

References

External links 
 Student Television Network



University and college mass media in the United States